This is a listing/"catalogue raisonné" of the works of the Maître de Plougastel and his workshop between 1570 and 1621. The work includes calvaries and crosses, church decoration and some miscellaneous items.  His best known work is the Calvary at Plougastel-Daoulas. He worked using kersanton stone. Little is known of the man himself. His work can be see in the diocese of Léon, the northern part of the diocese of Cornouaille and in the Cap-Sizun area. His three main works are the Plougastel-Daoulas calvary erected between 1602 and 1604 and entirely his work, part of the porch at Guimiliau, and the calvary at Locmélar apart from the pietà and the statue of the Virgin Mary reversed with Mary Magdalene.

Church decoration

Calvaries and crosses
Apart from the grand calvary at Plougastel-Daoulas, see Calvary at Plougastel-Daoulas, the Maître de Plougastel is attributed with four crosses and over twenty calvaries. The first of the four crosses can be seen in Morlaix. This is in the Saint-Charles cemetery and has three statues but the atelier only carved the crucifix. For two further crosses they added just the crucifix and the Virgin Mary with child and these are located at Saint-Thėgonnec to the south west of Kerorven and at Plougasnou at Kerangroas-Saint-Georges. The fourth cross is located at La Motte in Sizun and this involves the crucifix reversed with Saint Andrew. On this cross the two statues of the Virgin Mary and a deacon are not by the atelier. Details of some of the many calvaries are given below.

Miscellaneous

Further reading
"Sculpteurs sur pierre en Basse-Bretagne. Les Ateliers du XVe au XVIIe Siècle" by Emmanuelle LeSeac'h. Published by Presses Universitaires de Rennes.

References

Calvaries in Brittany
Buildings and structures in Finistère